Walter Vincent McDonald (born November 5, 1920 in Lowellville, Ohio – April 16, 2012 in Flagstaff, Arizona)  was an American football defensive back in the All-America Football Conference for the Miami Seahawks, Brooklyn Dodgers, and the Chicago Hornets.  He played college football and college basketball at Tulane University and was drafted in the tenth round of the 1943 NFL Draft by the Washington Redskins.

References

1920 births
2012 deaths
American football defensive backs
Brooklyn Dodgers (AAFC) players
Chicago Hornets players
Miami Seahawks players
People from Mahoning County, Ohio
Tulane Green Wave football players